The 2018 Troy Trojans football team represented Troy University in the 2018 NCAA Division I FBS football season. The Trojans played their home games at Veterans Memorial Stadium in Troy, Alabama, and competed in the East Division of the Sun Belt Conference. They were led by fourth-year head coach Neal Brown. They finished the season 10–3, 7–1 in Sun Belt play to finish in a tie for the East Division championship with Appalachian State. Due to their head-to-head loss to Appalachian State, they did not represent the East Division in the Sun Belt Championship Game. They were invited to the Dollar General Bowl where they defeated Buffalo.

Previous season
The Trojans finished the 2017 season 11–2, 7–1 in Sun Belt play to finish in a tie for the Sun Belt championship. They received an invitation to the New Orleans Bowl where they defeated North Texas.

Preseason

Award watch lists
Listed in the order that they were released

Sun Belt coaches poll
On July 19, 2018, the Sun Belt released their preseason coaches poll with the Trojans predicted to finish in second place in the East Division.

Preseason All-Sun Belt Teams
The Trojans had ten players at eleven positions selected to the preseason all-Sun Belt teams.

Offense

1st team

Tristan Crowder – OL

Deontae Crumitie – OL

2nd team

Deondre Douglas – WR

Defense

1st team

Hunter Reese – DL

Trevon Sanders – DL

Tron Folsom – LB

Blace Brown – DB

2nd team

Marcus Webb – DL

Marcus Jones – DB

Cedarius Rookard – DB

Special teams

2nd team

Marcus Jones – KR

Schedule

Game summaries

Boise State

Florida A&M

at Nebraska

at Louisiana–Monroe

Coastal Carolina

Georgia State

at Liberty

at South Alabama

Louisiana

at Georgia Southern

Texas State

at Appalachian State

vs. Buffalo (Dollar General Bowl)

References

Troy
Troy Trojans football seasons
LendingTree Bowl champion seasons
Troy Trojans football